Maurice Joseph Malone (February 28, 1890 – May 15, 1969) was a Canadian professional ice hockey centre. He played in the National Hockey Association (NHA) and National Hockey League (NHL) for the Quebec Bulldogs, Montreal Canadiens, and Hamilton Tigers from 1910 to 1924. Known for his scoring feats and clean play, Malone led the NHL in goals and points in 1918 and 1920. He is the only player in the history of the NHL to score seven goals in a single game, accomplishing the feat in 1920. He was elected to the Hockey Hall of Fame in 1950.

Personal life
Malone, the second of eleven children, was born in Sillery, a town outside of Quebec City, on February 28, 1890. His father, Maurice Joseph Malone, was of Irish descent and also related to the Gignac family, of Quebecois origin. His mother was Marie-Louise Rochon, who was Quebecois herself. Maurice Joseph worked in the lumber industry, as did his father and grandfather. Malone played hockey from an early age: he was noted in local newspapers as early as 1904 for his exploits, with one report calling him "a rising star".

Playing career

1908–1917

As a junior Malone played with the Quebec Crescents and in 1909, at the age of 19, he joined the Quebec Bulldogs of the Eastern Canada Hockey Association, making his senior debut on January 2, 1909. He finished tied for first on the team in scoring with 8 goals in 12 games.

The next season, in 1910, a new league, the National Hockey Association (NHA) was formed, but did not allow Quebec to join. Malone and several other Quebec players instead signed with the Waterloo Colts in the Ontario Professional Hockey League. With Waterloo Malone played eleven games and scored nine goals. The Quebec club was reformed in 1911 and joined the NHA, so Malone returned to the team, where he scored 9 goals in 13 games. He centred linemates such as Eddie Oatman and Jack Marks, he scored 21 goals in 18 games in the 1911–12 season as Quebec finished first in the league, and consequently won the Stanley Cup. Quebec again won the Cup in 1913 as Malone recorded 43 goals in 20 games – including a career-best nine goals in a Cup match against Sydney. His brother Jeff Malone also played for Quebec in 1913 when they won the Stanley Cup. Malone finished fourth in the NHA during the 1913–14 season, with 24 goals in 17 games. He missed some games in the 1914–15 season due to spraining an ankle during a game in January 1915, which kept him out until mid-February; in the 12 games he played he had 16 goals. Malone returned to form for 1915–16 when he finished second in goal scoring with 26 goals in 24 games.

In 1916–17, Malone scored 41 goals in 19 games in the NHA, finishing tied for the scoring lead with Frank Nighbor of the Ottawa Senators. Malone was in the scoring lead until the final game of the season, when he played Nighbor and the Senators. Ottawa had two players cover Malone the entire game, while Nighbor was able to score 5 goals and finish tied.

1917–1924
When the NHL was founded in 1917, Quebec did not operate a team its first season, and the team's players were sold to the other teams for $700 each; Malone was claimed by the Montreal Canadiens. Playing on what was one of the most powerful forward lines of all time with Newsy Lalonde and Didier Pitre, Malone shifted to left wing to accommodate Lalonde. Malone scored one of the first goals in NHL history, on the league's opening night of December 19, 1917; he finished the game with five goals. He had two other games with five goals during the season, and finished with 44 goals in 20 games, leading the league. Malone established a league record for goals in a season that lasted until 1945; his goals-per-game average has not been surpassed. Malone scored at least one goal (and a total of 35 goals) in his first 14 NHL games to set the record for the longest goal-scoring streak to begin an NHL career.

The following season Malone suffered an injured arm and missed most of the regular season, although he scored five goals in five games in the league final series against the Ottawa Senators; the lingering injury held him out of the ill-fated Cup finals against the Seattle Metropolitans which was cancelled after five games due to the Spanish flu pandemic.

Quebec revived its franchise in 1919 and Malone rejoined the club, once more leading the league in scoring with 39 goals, and setting a single game goal-scoring mark which still stands of seven against Toronto on January 31, 1920. He score six goals in a second game that season on March 10, 1920 against the Senators. However, the team was very weak on the ice, and finished the season with 4 wins and 20 losses, last in the league.

The team was relocated to Hamilton for the 1921 season. Malone did not initially join the team, instead staying in Quebec to attend to his business interests. He joined the team in January 1921, having missed the first four games of the season. He finished finished fourth in league scoring with 28 goals. He finished fourth in scoring the following season, as well. For 1921–22 he served as a player-coach and manager for the Tigers.

Malone decided to not return to Hamilton for the 1922–23 season. He was traded back to the Canadiens on January 3, 1923, in exchange for Edmond Bouchard. He scored only a single goal that season while generally playing as a substitute. He played nine games without scoring the next season, playing his last game on January 23 against his former team in Hamilton, before retiring. The Canadiens did not include his name on the Cup in 1924, because he did not play in the playoffs. However, he is credited by the NHL as winning his third Stanley Cup that season.

Playing style

Malone spent the majority of his playing career as a centre forward, and he had a particular penchant for finding open space on the ice for his goal scoring. Malone earned his famous nickname, "Phantom Joe", both for his dark eyes, and from his ability to find openings offensively and weave his way to the net in an almost invisible fashion. In an era known for its violence and physicality, Malone was regarded more as a finesse player, with another nickname of his being "Gentleman Joe". Contrary to many other players of his era, such as his Quebec teammate Joe Hall (with the nickname "Bad Joe") and his Montreal teammate Newsy Lalonde, Malone also did not have a reputation as a particularly rough player, but rather as one of the cleanest players in the game. He was also considered a great stickhandler. During his time with the Montreal Canadiens in the NHL Malone was also successful in holding down the left wing position, playing alongside centre forward Newsy Lalonde.

Malone was not considered to be one of the fastest players in the game, but rather a smooth player who knew exactly how to position himself around the opposing goal cage. The December 30, 1919 issue of the Ottawa Journal reproduced a conversation between three hockey fans, where a veteran spectator of 25 years, who had seen all the great players in the game, gave echo to this sentiment and compared Malone's abilities to those of baseball second baseman Eddie Collins, an opinion the newspaper itself agreed with.

Legacy

Malone finished his career with 343 goals and 32 assists over 15 professional seasons. His 179 goals in the NHA were the most in the league's history. The 44 goals he scored in the 1917–18 season were an NHL record until Maurice Richard broke it in 1944–45, while Malone's 49 points in 1919–20 was the most until Howie Morenz had 59 in 1927–28. He is also the only player in NHL history to score 6 goals in a game more than once.

He was elected to the Hockey Hall of Fame in 1950, and is also a member of Canada's Sports Hall of Fame. In 1998, he was ranked number 39 on The Hockey News''' list of the 100 Greatest Hockey Players. The list was announced 74 years after his last game and 91 years after his professional debut, making him the earliest player on the list.

He was a second cousin of Sarsfield and Foster Malone, who played briefly in the NHA. His nephew, Cliff Malone, briefly played in the NHL, as well.

Malone died of a heart attack on May 15, 1969, in Montreal, Quebec.

A statue by artist Frédéric Laforge of Malone with a bulldog, entitled Hommage à Joe Malone, was inaugurated on June 10, 2021, and is located at Place Jean-Béliveau at the ExpoCité in Quebec City. The statue pays homage to Malone's nickname, "Phantom Joe."

Career statistics
Regular season and playoffs

Source: Total Hockey''

NHL records
 Most goals in one game (7), January 31, 1920 at Quebec.
 Most games played with 5 goals or more: 5
 Highest goals-per-game average, one season: 2.20 with Montreal, 1917–18 season (44 goals in 20 games)
 Fastest player in NHL history to score 100 goals: 62 games
 Most consecutive three-or-more goal games: 3 (1917–18 and again later in that season), tied with Mike Bossy (1980–81)
 Longest consecutive goal-scoring streak from start of NHL career: 14 games (1917–18)

See also
 List of past NHL scoring leaders
 List of players with five or more goals in an NHL game

References

Notes

Citations

References

External links

 

1890 births
1969 deaths
Anglophone Quebec people
Canadian ice hockey centres
Hamilton Tigers (ice hockey) players
Hockey Hall of Fame inductees
Ice hockey people from Quebec City
Montreal Canadiens players
National Hockey League scoring leaders (prior to 1947–48)
People from Sainte-Foy–Sillery–Cap-Rouge
Quebec Bulldogs (NHA) players
Quebec Bulldogs players
Quebec people of Irish descent
Stanley Cup champions